The Ahmavaara mine is one of the largest gold mines in Finland and in the world. The mine is located in the north of the country in Lapland. The mine has estimated reserves of 4.5 million oz of gold, 3.4 million oz of palladium and 0.72 million oz of platinum. The mine also has ore reserves amounting to 78.1 million tonnes grading 0.24% copper and 0.09% nickel.

See also

References 

Gold mines in Finland
Copper mines in Finland
Nickel mines in Finland
Palladium mines